Stelis resupinata is a species of orchid plant native to Mexico.

References 

resupinata
Flora of Mexico